The Royal Elephant National Museum, also known as Chang Ton National Museum, is a museum located in Dusit District, Bangkok, Thailand. Permanent closed

External links
Thailand Travel Tours - Royal Elephant National Museum

Museums in Bangkok
National museums of Thailand
History museums in Thailand